Francesco Rizzo may refer to:

 Francesco Rizzo (footballer) (1943–2022), Italian footballer
 Francesco Rizzo da Santacroce (1500s-1541), painter